The Trio (alternatively titled The Trio: Live From Chicago) is a 1961 live album by the Oscar Peterson Trio, recorded at the London House jazz club in Chicago, during a period in which the pianist "was generally in peak form."

Three other Oscar Peterson Trio albums were also released featuring music from the London House concerts: The Sound of the Trio, Something Warm and Put On a Happy Face. The complete  sessions were released in 1996 as The London House Sessions.

Track listing
Side One
"I've Never Been in Love Before" (Frank Loesser) – 5:35
"In the Wee Small Hours of the Morning" (Bob Hilliard, David Mann) – 8:07
"Chicago" (Fred Fisher) – 8:55
Side Two
  "The Night We Called It a Day" (Tom Adair, Matt Dennis) – 4:47
"Sometimes I'm Happy" (Irving Caesar, Clifford Grey, Vincent Youmans) – 11:41
"Whisper Not" (Benny Golson) – 5:46
"Billy Boy" (Traditional) – 1:46

1997 CD reissue bonus tracks
  "The Lonesome One" (Oscar Peterson) – 5:32
"The Gravy Waltz" (Steve Allen, Ray Brown) – 4:54
"Woody 'n' You" (Dizzy Gillespie) – 3:48
"Soon" (George Gershwin, Ira Gershwin) – 9:20
"Daahoud" (Clifford Brown) – 5:52

Recorded July 28 (#1–3, 7) and July 29 (#4–6, 8–12), 1961 at the London House, Chicago.

Personnel
Oscar Peterson – piano
Ray Brown – double bass
Ed Thigpen – drums

References

Oscar Peterson live albums
Albums produced by Norman Granz
Albums recorded at The London House, Chicago
1961 live albums
Verve Records live albums